Mantamar Beach Club Bar & Sushi (formerly Mantamar Beach Club Bar & Grill) is an LGBT bar in Puerto Vallarta's Zona Romántica, in the Mexican state of Jalisco.

Description and history
The club opened . Owned by Vidal Meza and Javier Jiménez, the bar was set ablaze, possibly by arson, shortly after opening. In 2020, Amy Ashenden of PinkNews said Mantamar "is the go-to place for – mostly – gay men", writing, "Although I spotted one small group of lesbians and they do occasionally throw lesbian parties in low season, it's definitely geared towards gay men looking to party".

In 2020, the establishment was fined after a video of patrons having sex in the pool went viral. The White Party Weekend in 2021 was canceled because of the COVID-19 pandemic.

See also

 LGBT culture in Mexico

References

External links

 

2013 establishments in Mexico
LGBT drinking establishments in Mexico
Zona Romántica